Sophie Bouillon (born 1984, Vesoul) is a French journalist.

Biography 
She worked as a correspondent based in Johannesburg from 2008 to 2013 for Libération, Courrier International and Radio Télévision Suisse in particular, before working as a freelance reporter since 2014 (L'Observateur, Liberation, RTS, Europe 1, ...)., covering Boko Haram in Nigeria, series on Lagos, the war in eastern Congo in 2012. She also works on social issues in France (immigration, suburbs, prostitution ...).

A stringer, she won the 2009 Albert Londres prize for her article Bienvenue chez Mugabe ! (ill. by Sergio Aquindo), published in the magazine XXI.

Publications 
2013: Une vie de pintade en Afrique du Sud, Paris, Éditions Calmann-Lévy, series "Documents, Actualités, Société", 370 p. 
2015: Elles, Les Prostituées et nous, Paris, Éditions Premier Parallèle, 120 p. .

Prizes and distinctions 
2009: Prix Albert-Londres.
2014: 2ème Prix Bayeux en radio for Europe 1 (Les milices civiles face à Boko Haram)

References

External links 
 Sophie Bouillon: qui est la plus jeune lauréate du prix Albert Londres ? on Les Inrockuptibles
 Sophie Bouillon's articles on Libération
 Boko Haram : Sophie Bouillon (Libé) raconte son reportage au Nigeria on Arrêt sur images
 Sophie Bouillon on France Culture

21st-century French journalists
French women journalists
Albert Londres Prize recipients
1984 births
People from Vesoul
Living people
21st-century French women